Lalitha Bhanu was a Carnatic singer. She has also sung a few songs for Malayalam and Tamil films as a playback singer.

Early life 
Lalitha was born at Trivandrum, Kerala, as the daughter of Narayana Bhagavathar and Parvathy ammal on 19 August 1931.
Her father, Narayana Bhagavathar was a violinist and one of the three Trivandrum Brothers. The brothers were Asthana Vidwans (in-house musicians) at the Royal Palace of Trivandrum. 
She learnt her initial lessons from K. R. Kumaraswamy. Afterwards she joined the Swati Tirunal College of Music, Thiruvananthapuram. Semmangudi Srinivasa Iyer was the principal of this college. She received training directly from him. 
When the family moved from Trivandrum to Madras (now Chennai), Srinivasa Iyer directed her to Musiri Subramania Iyer. She learned many Kritis for about 8 years from Musiri Subramania Iyer. Musiri even made Lalitha sing all the varnams in his own style, thereby imbibing in her the “Musiri bhani”.
She learnt many kritis from Papanasam Sivan,

Music career 
Her first public concert was staged at Mavelikkara (Kerala). She was an artiste in All India Radio and sang for almost 50 years at various radio stations of the AIR including Pondichery and Chennai. 
She had performed at the Tyagaraja Aradhana.

Playback singer 

Lalitha had sung in a few Malayalam and Tamil films as a playback singer. She began her film career with Ponkathir, a Malayalam language film released in 1953. The traditional song "Anjana Sreedhara" was a hit.
When this film was made in Tamil with the title Irulukkuppin she sang for that too.
She has sung under several music directors including Br Lakshmanan, V. Dakshinamoorthy, G. Ramanathan, Ghantasala, Pendyala Nageshwara Rao and C. N. Pandurangan.

List of film songs

List of Carnatic songs 

All these songs are available on YouTube.

Titles and awards 
Lalitha Bhanu was conferred with the title "Ganabooshanam" and was presented with a Tambura (with an emblem of Swathi Tirunal) by Semmangudi Srinivasa Iyer.

Family life 
Lalitha was married to Perumal Bhanu Bharadwaj. They had three children including two daughters and a son, Anand Bhanu Bharadwaj.

Death 
She died on 20 August 2020 at Chennai.

Bibliography 
 List of Malayalam songs sung by Ganabhooshanam N. Lalitha

References

External links 
  - in Malayalam language Amrita TV
  - Her hit song from the film Ponkathir.
  - Meenakshi Memudam in Poorvikalyani raga.
  - (Duration 55:20) was probably performed sometime in the 1960s

1931 births
2020 deaths
Carnatic singers
People from Thiruvananthapuram